Najbolje od najgoreg is the first compilation album by the Serbian garage rock/punk rock band Partibrejkers, released by MuSicLand in 1996.

Track listing

Notes 
 Tracks 1 to 7 from Partibrejkers I
 Tracks 8 to 10 from Partibrejkers II
 Tracks 11 to 14 from Partibrejkers III
 Tracks 15 to 18 from Kiselo i slatko
 Tracks 19 and 20 previously unreleased, recorded in Ostudio during February 1996

References 
 Najbolje od najgoreg at Discogs

1996 compilation albums
Partibrejkers compilation albums